Elena Recco (Naples, c. 1654 – Madrid, 1715)  was an Italian still-life painter active in the second half of the 17th century.

Born in Naples, she was the daughter of the still-life painter Giuseppe Recco and the sister of Nicola Maria Recco. She accompanied her father to Spain and is mentioned working at the Spanish court in Madrid after he died in 1695. She is known for still-life paintings of fish.

References

1700 deaths
Italian women painters
Italian still life painters
Painters from Naples
1654 births
17th-century Italian women artists
18th-century Italian women artists